Dolhun Field Airport  is a private airport founded by Theodore Dolhun in 1945 located 1.54 miles northwest of Lake Tomahawk, Wisconsin in Oneida County, just off of Highway 47.

Facilities 
It has one runway designated 18/36 with an asphalt surface measuring 2,700 by 75 feet (823 x 23 m).  
In August 2017, there were 2 aircraft based at this airport: 2 single-engine.

References

External links 
 Aerial image as of 27 April 1998 from USGS The National Map

Airports in Wisconsin
Buildings and structures in Oneida County, Wisconsin